Information technology management
19770

International standards in the ISO/IEC 19770 family of standards for IT asset management address both the processes and technology for managing software assets and related IT assets. Broadly speaking, the standard family belongs to the set of Software Asset Management (or SAM) standards and is integrated with other Management System Standards.

ISO/IEC 19770 day-to-day management comes under ISO/IEC JTC 1/SC 7/WG 21, or Working Group 21 (WG21) chaired by Ron Brill as convener and Trent Allgood as secretary. It is WG21 that is responsible for developing, improving and ensuring market needs are met when developing these standards.

What is the purpose of ISO 19770?

The ISO 19770 standard is a concept of ITAM standardization within an organization incorporating ISO/IEC standards.

The objective of the standard is to give organizations of all sizes information and assistance to assist at the risk and cost minimization of ITAM assets. Through implementation, these same organizations will acquire a competitive advantage through:

 Management of the risk of interrupted IT service delivery, breach of legal agreements and audit;
 Reducing overall software costs through the implementation of various processes; and
 Better information availability leading to improved decision-making based on accurate data.

The major parts of this ITAM standard are detailed below.

 ISO/IEC 19770-1 is a process framework to enable an organization to prove that it is performing ITAM to a standard sufficient to satisfy corporate governance requirements and ensure effective support for IT service management overall.
 ISO/IEC 19770-2 provides an ITAM data standard for software identification tags ("SWID").
 ISO/IEC 19770-3 provides an ITAM data standard for software entitlements, including usage rights, limitations and metrics ("ENT").
 ISO/IEC 19770-4 provides an ITAM data standard for Resource Utilization Measurement ("RUM")
 ISO/IEC 19770-5 provides the overview and vocabulary.

ISO/IEC 19770-1: Processes
ISO/IEC 19770-1 is a framework of ITAM processes to enable an organization to prove that it is performing software asset management to a standard sufficient to satisfy corporate governance requirements and ensure effective support for IT service management overall. ISO/IEC 19770-1:2017 specifies the requirements for the establishment, implementation, maintenance and improvement of a management system for IT asset management (ITAM), referred to as an “IT asset management system” (ITAMS).

While ISO 55001:2014 specifies the requirements for the establishment, implementation, maintenance and improvement of a management system for asset management, referred to as an “asset management system”, it is primarily focused on physical assets with little provision for the management of software assets. There are a number of characteristics of IT assets which create additional or more detailed requirements. As a result of these characteristics of IT assets, the 19770-1 management system for IT assets has explicit additional requirements dealing with:

 controls over software modification, duplication and distribution, with particular emphasis on access and integrity controls;
 audit trails of authorizations and of changes made to IT assets;
 controls over licensing, underlicensing, overlicensing, and compliance with licensing terms and conditions;
 controls over situations involving mixed ownership and responsibilities, such as in cloud computing and with ‘Bring-Your-Own-Device’ (BYOD) practices; and
 reconciliation of IT asset management data with data in other information systems when justified by business value, in particular with financial information systems recording assets and expenses.

Updates to 19770-1

The first generation was published in 2006.

The second generation was published in 2012. It retained the original content (with only minor changes) but splits the standard up into four tiers which can be attained sequentially. These tiers are:

 Tier 1: Trustworthy Data
 Tier 2: Practical Management
 Tier 3: Operational Integration
 Tier 4: Full ISO/IEC ITAM Conformance

ISO 19770-1 Edition 3 (current version)

The most recent version, known as ISO 19770-1:2017 and published in December 2017, specifies the requirements for the establishment, implementation, maintenance, and improvement of a management system for IT asset management (ITAM), referred to as an IT asset management system. ISO 19770-1:2017 was a major update and rewrote the standard to conform to the ISO Management System Standards (MSS) format. The tiered structure from 197701:2012 was moved to an appendix within the updated standard.

Intended Users

This document can be used by any organization and can be applied to all types of IT assets. The organization determines to which of its IT assets this document applies.
This document is primarily intended for use by:
 those involved in the establishment, implementation, maintenance, and improvement of an IT asset management system;
 those involved in delivering IT asset management activities, including service providers;
 internal and external parties to assess the organization’s ability to meet legal, regulatory and contractual requirements and the organization’s own requirements.

ISO/IEC 19770-2: software identification tag
ISO/IEC 19770-2 provides an ITAM data standard for software identification (SWID) tags. Software ID tags provide authoritative identifying information for installed software or other licensable item (such as fonts or copyrighted papers).

Overview of SWID tags in use 

There are three primary methods that may be used to ensure SWID tags are available on devices with installed software:
 SWID tags created by a software creator or publisher which are installed with the software are the most authoritative for identification purposes.
 Organizations can create their own SWID tags for any software title that does not include a tag, allowing the organization to more accurately track software installations in their network environment
 Third party discovery tools may optionally add tags to a device as software titles are discovered

Providing accurate software identification data improves organizational security, and lowers the cost and increases the capability of many IT processes such as  patch management, desktop management, help desk management, software policy compliance, etc.

Discovery tools, or processes that utilize SWID tag data to determine the normalized names and values that are associated with a software application and ensure that all tools and processes used by an organization refer to software products with the same exact names and values.

Standards development information 

This standard was first published in November 2009.  A revision of this standard was published in October 2015.

Steve Klos is the editor of 19770-2 and works for 1E, Inc as a SAM Subject Matter Expert.

Non-profit organizational support 

As of November 28, 2022, TagVault.org looks like a product review page. However, if you search for SWID, you will find articles about it. In 2009, a non-profit organization called TagVault.org was formed under IEEE-ISTO to press for using SWID tags. TagVault.org acts as a registration and certification authority for ISO/IEC 19770-2 software identification tags (SWID tags) and will provide tools and services allowing all SAM ecosystem members to take advantage of SWID tags faster, with a lower cost and with more industry compatibility than would otherwise be possible. SWID tags can be created by anyone, so individuals and organizations are not required to be part of TagVault.org to create or distribute tags.

Commercial organizational support

Numerous Windows installation packaging tools utilize SWID tags including:
 Caphyon's Advanced Installer
 Flexera Software's InstallShield
 Flexera Software's InstallAnywhere
 Open Source - Windows Installer XML Toolset (WiX)

Many software discovery tools already utilize SWID tags, including Altiris, Aspera SmartCollect, DeskCenter Management Suite, Belarc's BelManage, Sassafras Software's K2-KeyServer, Snow Inventory, CA Technologies discovery tools, Eracent's EnterpriseAM, Flexera Software's FlexNet Manager Platform, HP's Universal Discovery, IBM Endpoint Manager, Microsoft's System Center 2012 R2 Configuration Manager, Loginventory, and Raynet's Rayventory.

Adobe has released multiple versions of their Creative Suites and  Creative Cloud products with SWID tags.

Symantec has also released multiple products that include SWID tags and is committed to helping move the software community to a more consistent and normalized approach to software identification and eventually to a more automated approach to compliance.

Microsoft Corporation has been adding SWID tags to all new releases of software products since Windows 8 was released.

IBM started shipping tags with some software products in early 2014, but as of November, all releases of IBM software include SWID tags. This equates to approximately 300 product releases a month that include SWID tags.

Governmental support 

The US federal government has identified 19770-2 SWID tags as an important aspect of the efforts necessary to manage compliance, logistics and security software processes. The 19770-2 standard is included on the US Department of Defense Information Standards Registry (DISR) as an emerging standard as of September 2012. The National Institute of Standards and Technology (NIST) and the National Cybersecurity Center of Excellence (NCCoE) in 2015 discussed the need for SWIDs in the marketplace.

Standards development organization support 

The Trusted Computing Group (TCG) is developing a standard TNC SWID Messages and Attributes for IF-M Specification that utilizes tag data for security purposes.

The National Cybersecurity Center of Excellence (NCCoE) has documented the Software Asset Management Continuous Monitoring building block that specifies how SWID tags are used for the near real-time identification of software.

The National Institute of Standards and Technology (NIST) is in the process of creating documentation that specifies how SWID tags will be used by governmental organizations including the Department of Homeland Security. David Waltermire presented information describing the NIST Security Automation Program and how SWID tags can support that effort.

The National Institute of Standards and Technology (NIST) published "Guidelines for the Creation of Interoperable Software Identification (SWID) Tags", NISTIR 8060, April 2016.

ISO/IEC 19770-3: software entitlement schema (ENT)
This part of ISO/IEC 19770 provides a technical definition of an XML schema that can encapsulate the details of software entitlements, including usage rights, limitations and metrics.

The primary intentions of 19770-3 are:

 To provide a basis for common terminology to be used when describing entitlement rights, limitations and metrics
 To provide a schema which allows effective description of rights, limitations and metrics attaching to a software license.

The specific information provided by an entitlement schema (ENT) may be used to help ensure compliance with license rights and limits, to optimize license usage and to control costs. Though ENT creators are encouraged to provide the data that allow for the automatic processing, it is not mandated that data be automatically measurable. The data structure is intended to be capable of containing any kind of terms and conditions included in a software license agreement.

This part of ISO/IEC 19770 supports ITAM processes as defined in ISO/IEC 19770-1 It is also designed to work together with software identification tags as defined in ISO/IEC 19770-2. Standardization in the field of software entitlements provides uniform, measurable data for both the license compliance, and license optimization, processes of SAM practice.

This part of ISO/IEC 19770 does not provide requirements or recommendations for processes related to software asset management or ENTs. The software asset management processes are in the scope of ISO/IEC 19770-1.

Standards development information

The ISO/IEC 19770-3 Other Working Group ("OWG") was convened by teleconference call on 9 September 2008.

John Tomeny of Sassafras Software Inc served as the convener and lead author of the ISO/IEC 19770-3 "Other Working Group" (later renamed the ISO/IEC 19770-3 Development Group). Mr Tomeny was appointed by Working Group 21 (ISO/IEC JTC 1/SC 7/WG 21) together with Krzysztof Bączkiewicz of Eracent who served as Project Editor concurrent with Mr. Tomeny's leadership. In addition to WG21 members, other participants in the 19770-3 Development Group served as "individuals considered to have relevant expertise by the Convener".

Jason Keogh of 1E and part of the delegation from Ireland is the current editor of 19770-3.

ISO/IEC 19770-3 was published on April 15, 2016.

Principles
This part of ISO/IEC 19770 has been developed with the following practical principles in mind:

Maximum possible usability with legacy entitlement information

The ENT, or software entitlement schema, is intended to provide the maximum possible usability with existing entitlement information, including all historical licensing transactions. While the specifications provide many opportunities for improvement in entitlement processes and practices, they must be able to handle existing licensing transactions without imposing requirements which would prevent such transactions being codified into Ent records.

Maximum possible alignment with the software identification tag specification (ISO/IEC 19770-2)

This part of ISO/IEC 19770 (entitlement schema) is intended to align closely with part 2 of the standard (software identification tags). This should facilitate both understanding and their joint use. Furthermore, any of the elements, attributes, or other specifications of part 2 which the ENT creator may wish to utilize may be used in this part as well.

Stakeholder benefits

It is intended that this standardized schema will be of benefit to all stakeholders involved in the creation, licensing, distribution, release, installation, and ongoing management of software and software entitlements.

Benefits to software licensors who provide  ENTs include, but are not limited to:
 Immediate software customer recognition of details of the usage rights derived from their software entitlement.
 Ability to specify details to customers that allow software assets to be measured and reported for license compliance purposes.
 Increased awareness of software license compliance issues on the part of end-customers.
 Improved software customer relationships through quicker and more effective license compliance audits.
Benefits to SAM tool providers, deployment tool providers, re-sellers, value-added re-sellers, packagers and release managers include, but are not limited to:
 Receipt of consistent and uniform data from software licensors and  ENT creators.
 More consistent and structured entitlement information, supporting the use of automated techniques to determine the need for remediation of software licensing.
 Improved reporting from additional categorization made possible by the use of  ENTs.
 Improved SAM tool entitlement reconciliation capabilities resulting from standardization in location and format of software entitlement data.
 Ability to deliver value-added functionality for compliance management through the consumption of entitlement data.
The benefits for software customers, SAM practitioners, IT support professionals and end users of a given software configuration item include, but are not limited to:
 Receipt of consistent and uniform data from software licensors, resellers and SAM tools providers.
 More consistent and structured entitlement information supporting the use of automated techniques to determine the need for remediation of software licensing.
 Improved reporting from additional categorization made possible by the use of  ENTs.
 Improved SAM and software license compliance capabilities stemming from standardized, software licensor-supplied, ISO/IEC 19770-2 software identification tags to reconcile with these  ENTs.
 Improved ability to avoid software license under-procurement or over-procurement with subsequent cost optimization.
 Standardized usage across multiple platforms, rendering heterogeneous computing environments more manageable.

The ITAM Review developed a podcast with the 19770-3 project editor how end-user organizations can leverage this standard to their benefit.  The link to the podcast is here.

ISO/IEC 19770-3: Entitlement Management

ISO 19770-3 relates to Entitlement tags - encapsulations of licensing terms, rights and limitations in a machine-readable, standardized format. The transport method (XML, JSON, etc.) is not defined, rather the meaning and name of specific data stores is outlined to facilitate a common schema between vendors and customers and tools providers.

The first commercial SAM tool to encapsulate ISO 19770-3 was AppClarity by 1E. Since then K2 by Sassafras Software has also encompassed 19770-3. As of the time of writing (February 2018) although other tools vendors have indicated interest in the standard but have not implemented same.

It is of note that Jason Keogh, Editor of the released 19770-3 works for 1E and John Tomeny (initial Editor of 19770-3) worked for Sassafras Software.

ISO/IEC 19770-4: Resource Utilization Measurement 
This document provides an International Standard for Resource Utilization Measurement (RUM). A RUM is a standardized structure containing usage information about the resources that are related to the use of an IT asset. A RUM will often be provided in an XML data file, but the same information may be accessible through other means depending on the platform and the IT asset/product.

This document contains information structures that are designed to align with the identification information defined in ISO/IEC 19770-2, and with the entitlement information defined in ISO/IEC 19770-3. When used together, these three types of information have the capability to significantly enhance and automate the processes of IT asset management.

This document supports the IT asset management processes defined in ISO/IEC 19770-1. This document also supports the other parts of the ISO/IEC 19770 series of standards that define information structures.

The RUM is specifically designed to be general-purpose and usable in a wide variety of situations. Like other information structures defined in the ISO/IEC 19770 series of standards, the consumer of a RUM may be an organization and/or a tool or other consumers. In contrast to the other information structures in the ISO/IEC 19770 series, the entity creating a RUM data on a periodic basis will likely be an IT asset or an automation tool monitoring an IT asset.

The definition of a RUM will benefit all stakeholders involved in the creation, licensing, distribution, releasing, installation, and on-going management of IT assets. Key benefits associated with a RUM for three specific groups of stakeholders include:

IT asset users
— RUM data will typically be generated and processed by IT assets and automation tools, within the consumers enterprise boundary, for purpose of IT asset compliance and optimization;
— RUM data is human readable and can provide improved visibility into resource utilization within IT assets independent of vendor or third-party supplied tools;
— the ability to combine identification, entitlement, and resource utilization information together to perform quantitative and authoritative IT asset management, for example, to meet compliance requirements;
— a much-improved ability to perform IT asset management in support of green data center strategies such as optimization of the use of power and air conditioning;

IT asset manufacturers
— the ability to consistently and authoritatively generate resource utilization information for consumption by a central facility that is maintained by the creator, or one or more third-party tools, or by the IT asset users;
— the ability to support multiple instances and types of third-party tools with a single set of functionality within the IT asset;
— the ability to offer a service to track real-time IT asset usage in the field and, when combined with identification and entitlement information, the ability to give advance warning as resource limits are approached;
— the ability to offer an alternative approach to asset utilization measurement to traditional techniques that employ key-based, or platform-restricted licenses;

Tool vendors
— the ability to support multiple IT assets, and types of IT asset, without having to create and maintain unique instrumentation that is associated with each asset;
— the ability to more easily aggregate usage information across multiple instances of an asset;
— a much-improved ability to track resource utilization and IT assets in near real-time.

ISO/IEC 19770-5: overview and vocabulary 
ISO/IEC 19770-5:2015 provides an overview of ITAM, which is the subject of the ISO/IEC 19770 family of standards, and defines related terms.  ISO/IEC 19770-5:2015 is applicable to all types of organization (e.g. commercial enterprises, government agencies, non-profit organizations).

ISO/IEC 19770-5:2015 contains:

 an overview of the ISO/IEC 19770 family of standards;
 an introduction to SAM;
 a brief description of the foundation principles and approaches on which SAM is based; and
 consistent terms and definitions for use throughout the ISO/IEC 19770 family of standards.

ISO/IEC 19770-8: Guidelines for mapping of industry practices to/from the ISO/IEC 19770 family of standards 

ISO/IEC 19770-8 defines requirements, guidelines, formats and approaches for use when producing a mapping document that defines how industry practices map to/from the ISO/IEC 19770 series. The 19770-8:2020 edition is focused solely on mappings to/from both the second edition of ISO/IEC 19770-1 that was published in 2012, or the third edition of ISO/IEC 19770-1 that was published in 2017.

There are currently three mappings publicly available using the 19770-8:2020 standard:
 PROZM ITAM Framework to/from ISO/IEC 19770-1:2017
 SAMAC 4.1 to/from ISO/IEC 19770-1:2012

References

External links
 ISO/IEC 19770-1:2017
ISO/IEC 19770-2:2015
 ISO/IEC 19770-3:2016
 ISO/IEC 19770-4:2017
 ISO/IEC 19770-5:2015
 Official WG21 web site
 Business Software Alliance
 International Association of Information Technology Asset Managers
 National Cybersecurity Center of Excellence
 National Institute for Standards and Technology
 Trusted Computing Group
 ITAM.ORG - Organization for IT Asset Management Professionals and ITAM Providers
 Australian Software Asset Management Association (ASAMA)

Information technology management
19770